Princess Ljubica's Residence is a palace located in Belgrade, the capital of Serbia. Because of its cultural and architectural importance the residence has been designated a Monument of Culture of Exceptional Importance.

History 
This palace was used for living until 1829, but taking into consideration its age and state Prince Miloš Obrenović had decided
to build another residence. New residence as it had been called during its construction was larger and more exclusive than the
Master’s as it was supposed to show the economic growth and further strengthening of power of Obrenović after having received the Hatisherif (Sultan's Edict) in 1830.

The building residence is one of the most remarkable among the preserved examples of civil architecture in the first half of the 19th century Belgrade. It was built during the period from 1829 to 1830. According to plans of Prince Miloš, the residence was supposed to have a twofold purpose – to be a home for his family, Princess Ljubica and his sons Milan and Mihailo, later rulers of Serbia and at the same time a residential palace. It was built according to ideas and under supervision of Hadži-Neimar, the pioneer of Serbian building and construction.

Prince Miloš decided to hire a constructor from Voden, Hadzi Nikola Zivkovic, since there were none in Belgrade at that time
for there were no construction activities for years. Thus Hadži-Neimar became the first builder of renewed Serbia and he managed all of Prince Miloš's buildings during his first reign. Foundation started in July 1829, and the residence was finished in late autumn 1830. Princess Ljubica informed her husband in a letter from November 22, 1830 that "they have settled in the new residence". A new Turkish bath (hammam), with one-storey wing was built later on in 1836.

Location 
It is situated at the corner of Kneza Sime Markovica Street and Kralja Petra Street, former Bogojavljanska and Dubrovacka Street, in one of the oldest parts of Belgrade. Just across the present Cathedral Church the Old palace of Prince was situated stretching from the entrance of today’s Building of the Patriarchate to the garden of current Princess Ljubica Residence.

Princess Ljubica Residence is placed in a free space in the center of a garden, initially fenced by a high wall as other buildings of this type and surrounded by greenery. It had an outer yard where one could enter through the car entrance as well as the spacious inner garden toward Kosancicev venac. Princess Ljubica Residence is facing the Sava River with its main
façade dominated by a bay window of the divanhana (tur. a room used for smoking and talking).

Architecture 
Residence’s base has a rectangular form and is proportionally large; it has three levels – basement, ground floor and an upper storey. The basement is covered by vaults while ground and upper storey have been built in classic brickwork and ”bondruk” manner with timber construction filled with unbaked bricks. Four slopes roof is covered with tiles with an octagonal dome and eight chimneys on it.

This building has all characteristics of city houses of Serbian-Balkan style. Ground and upper storey have a centre hall around which all other rooms are situated, showing a traditional Oriental space concept, which originates from former closed inner yard model. There are divanhanas on both floors, which is a type of today’s dining room, but also a reception salon. The ground floor divanhana is separated from the rest of the area by two steps and lined by wooden columns divided with parapets. Wide stairs, leading into garden, are located immediately beside it and this entrance is wider than the one leading toward the street.

The other divanhana, on the upper floor, is more intimate. It is lined with walls on the side, and it has only two columns facing the central space. Its floor was in line with the surrounding floor and they were all made out of wood. This divanhana is overviewing the street.

Although leaning to Oriental tradition with its spacious concept, Princess Ljubica Residence represents the breaking point in architecture of Belgrade, because it largely indicates the influence of European architecture with its exterior design and decorative elements. These European concepts are especially notable in diversity of facades, broken roof lines, chimneys and dome, in secondary details of architectonic façade treatment – pilasters, arch endings and window surroundings, profiled wreaths and some interior details. Bay windows on a façade of Princess Ljubica Residence which are usually rectangular have a half-circular base.

Development of the residence 

One of the first records about Princess Ljubica Residence is from travel-writer Otto Dubislav Pirch, from 1892: “One small part of Belgrade stands out in comparison to others, and this is one small place at the Southwest end of the upper town main street. (…) Although not the largest in its form it is the most beautiful building I have seen in Serbia“.1 Consistent to its intended function, the new Residence differed from the common private houses and it “contains certain characteristics which (…) place it among fortified palaces of great Pashas and wealthy Beys (tur. for a leader of a small region or province)“.

Princess Ljubica, modest by nature, wanted to arrange a high life in the Palace. Saved correspondence between the Princess and Prince Milos from January 1, 1831 states that the Princess asked her husband “to provide red socks for servants in the palace“. Presumably, the Princess got a negative reply, considering that in the letter from January 24 she claims “that she can manage without any servants“.

The main state treasury was situated in Princess Ljubica Residence during the first reign of Prince Milos. Princedom Regency held their sessions in the Residence until the return of Prince Miahilo to Serbia in 1840, who lived there until 1842.

From the Lyceum to the gallery and the museum 
The Lyceum was afterwards situated there, then the First Grammar School of Belgrade and the Supreme Court of Appeals. The Institution for education of deaf and dumb children was situated here in 1912 and Contemporary Art Museum since 1929. The Residence housed the Church Museum until April 6, 1941. Part of Patriarchate was located here from 1945–47 and the Republic Institute for Cultural Heritage Preservation since 1947.

Preservation and restoration works were performed during the period from 1971 to 1979, when rehabilitation and renewal of facades and interiors were carried out. On this occasion, Princess Ljubica Residence, today an integral part of the Museum of Belgrade, was adapted for a prestigious museum exhibit.

Princess Ljubica Residence has been proclaimed as 1st category cultural property in 1979.

Gallery

References

External links

Obrenović dynasty
Cultural Monuments of Exceptional Importance (Serbia)
Architecture in Serbia
Ottoman architecture in Serbia
Buildings and structures in Belgrade
Houses completed in 1831
Palaces in Serbia
Manor houses in Serbia